The 1935 Donington Grand Prix was a non-championship Grand Prix that was held on 2 October 1935 at Donington Park in North West Leicestershire, England. It was the 39th race of the 1935 Grand Prix season. The race, which was 120 laps, was won by Richard Shuttleworth driving a Alfa Romeo Tipo-B "P3" after starting from 7th place.

It was the first major international Grand Prix to take place on a road course in Great Britain.

Entries

Qualifying 

The grid consisted of five rows of three, with cars supposed to be lined up with fastest in the middle, second fastest on left and third fastest on the right. It is unclear why Handley started from row 4, why Martin and Rose had swapped positions, or why Dobbs and Everitt started from the back row.

Race

References 

Donington Grand Prix
1935 in motorsport
1935 in British motorsport
1935 in Grand Prix racing